The 2012 NBA All-Star Game was an exhibition basketball game that was played on February 26, 2012, during the National Basketball Association's (NBA) 2011–12 season. It was the 61st edition of the NBA All-Star Game, and was played at the Amway Center in Orlando, Florida, home of the Orlando Magic. The Western Conference defeated the Eastern Conference, 152–149. Kevin Durant was named the All-Star Game Most Valuable Player.

The Orlando Magic were awarded the All-Star Game in an announcement by commissioner David Stern on May 4, 2010. This was also the second time that Orlando has hosted the All-Star Game; the city had previously hosted the event in 1992 in the Orlando Arena, the Magic's previous home arena. This game also marked the first time an Eastern Conference city hosted an All-Star game since Atlanta in 2003. Despite the 2011 NBA lockout, which reduced the regular season to sixty-six games on a condensed schedule, the All-Star Game took place as scheduled. 

The All-Star Weekend began on Friday, February 24, 2012 with the Celebrity Game and the Rising Stars Challenge, a game featuring the league's best rookies and second-year players. On Saturday, the event continued with the All-Star Saturday Night, which featured the Shooting Stars Competition, Skills Challenge, Three-Point Shootout and Slam Dunk Contest. The D-League All-Star Game and the D-League Dream Factory, which includes the Slam Dunk Contest, Three-Point Shootout and Shooting Stars Competition, also took place during the All-Star Weekend. Both events were held on Saturday before the NBA All-Star Saturday Night.

All-Star Game

Coaches

The coaches for the All-Star game are the head coaches who led the teams with the best winning percentages in their conference through the games of February 15, 2012. The head coaches from the previous year, Doc Rivers and Gregg Popovich were not eligible for selection.

The coach for the Western Conference team was Oklahoma City Thunder head coach Scott Brooks. The Thunder had a 22–7 record on February 15, the best record in the Western Conference. The coach for the Eastern Conference team was Chicago Bulls head coach Tom Thibodeau. The Bulls had a 23–7 record on February 15, the best record in the Eastern Conference and in the league. This was the first All-Star Game selection for both Brooks and Thibodeau.

Players

The rosters for the All-Star Game were chosen in two ways. The starters were chosen via a fan ballot. Two guards, two forwards and one center who received the highest vote were named the All-Star starters. The reserves were chosen by votes among the NBA head coaches in their respective conferences. The coaches were not permitted to vote for their own players. The reserves consist of two guards, two forwards, one center and two players regardless of position. If a player is unable to participate due to injury, the commissioner will select a replacement.

Dwight Howard of the Orlando Magic topped the ballots with 1,600,390 votes, which earned him a starting position as a center in the Eastern Conference team. Derrick Rose, Dwyane Wade, LeBron James, and Carmelo Anthony completed the Eastern Conference starting position. Howard, Rose, Wade and James were starters for the previous year's Eastern Conference team, while Anthony started for the Western Conference team. The Eastern Conference reserves includes three first-time selections, Luol Deng, Andre Iguodala, and Roy Hibbert. Atlanta Hawks guard Joe Johnson suffered an injury and was replaced by Boston Celtics guard Rajon Rondo. The Miami Heat is represented by three players, Wade, James and Chris Bosh, while the Chicago Bulls and the Celtics are represented by two players each.

The Western Conference's leading vote-getter was Kobe Bryant, who earned his fourteenth consecutive All-Star Game selection with 1,555,479 votes. Chris Paul, Kevin Durant, Blake Griffin, and Andrew Bynum completed the Western Conference starting positions. Bryant, Paul and Durant were starters for the previous year's Western Conference team. Griffin became an All-Star Game starter for the first time after he was selected as a reserve in last year's game. Bynum received 1,051,945 votes to earn his first All-Star Game selection and a starting position at center. Bryant/Bynum and Paul/Griffin became the first two pair of teammates who were voted to start for one conference since the 1997 game. The Western Conference reserves include two other first-time selections, LaMarcus Aldridge and Marc Gasol. Both Los Angeles teams, the Lakers and the Los Angeles Clippers, are represented by two players each, all of them are starters. Durant, of the Oklahoma City Thunder, is the only Western Conference starter that does not play in either teams of Los Angeles. The Thunder is also represented by two players, Durant and Russell Westbrook.

Roster

 Joe Johnson was unable to participate due to injury.
 Rajon Rondo was named as Joe Johnson's replacement.

Game

The West led by as many as 21 points and held on to win the game, 152–149. Kevin Durant scored 34 of his game-high 36 points in the first three quarters and was named the game's Most Valuable Player. LeBron James also scored 36. The West's lead was reduced to one point at 148–147 after a Deron Williams' steal and layup with 1:44 remaining. Leading 151–149, Blake Griffin secured the victory with a steal of a James' pass. Griffin was fouled and made one of two free throws with 1.1 seconds left. Kobe Bryant was guarding James on the pass and chastised James for not attempting a shot. Bryant left the game earlier in the third quarter after he was bloodied from a hard foul to his face by Dwyane Wade. He was diagnosed after the game with a broken nose and a concussion.

Bryant finished with 27 points and became the leading scorer in All-Star history (271), passing Michael Jordan (262). Wade had 24 points, 10 rebounds, and 10 assists, joining James and Jordan as the only players to record a triple-double in the All-Star game. The West set an All-Star record with 88 first-half points, and the teams' 157 combined points at the half was also a record. The 301 combined points at the end of the game were two shy of the record set (in overtime) in the 1987 NBA All-Star Game. The East made 14 three-point field goals, another record.

All-Star Weekend

BBVA Rising Stars Challenge

The BBVA Rising Stars Challenge featured the best first-year players ('Rookies') and the best second-year players ('Sophomores') going at each other. The game was divided into two twenty-minute halves, similar to college basketball. For this edition of the Rising Stars Challenge, a pool of the participating players was selected by the league's assistant coaches. Then, the teams were drafted by former NBA players and current TNT analysts Shaquille O'Neal and Charles Barkley, who serve as "General Managers" for their respective teams. Former NBA player and current TNT analyst Kenny Smith served as the "Honorary Commissioner" for the Rising Stars Challenge. Sophomore Jeremy Lin of the New York Knicks and rookie Norris Cole of the Miami Heat were two last-minute additions to the player pool. Sophomore Derrick Favors of the Utah Jazz was selected as an injury replacement for Tiago Splitter. Lin played only nine minutes in the game, at his request, due to exhaustion from his rise to stardom that month.

 Tiago Splitter was unable to participate due to injury.
 Derrick Favors was named Tiago Splitter's replacement.
 Kawhi Leonard did not play due to injury.

Kyrie Irving, who scored 34 points on 8/8 three-point shooting, won the MVP award of the Rising Stars Challenge.

Sprite Slam Dunk Contest

 Iman Shumpert was unable to participate due to injury.
 Jeremy Evans was named Iman Shumpert's replacement.

Foot Locker Three-Point Contest

 Joe Johnson was unable to participate due to injury.
 Kevin Durant was named as Joe Johnson's replacement.

Taco Bell Skills Challenge

 Stephen Curry was unable to participate due to injury.
 Rajon Rondo was named as Curry's replacement.

Haier Shooting Stars Competition

 Joe Johnson was unable to participate due to injury.
 Jerry Stackhouse was named as Joe Johnson's replacement.

References

External links
 2012 All-Star Game at NBA.com

National Basketball Association All-Star Game
All-Star Game
NBA All-Star Game
2010s in Orlando, Florida
Basketball competitions in Orlando, Florida
ABS-CBN television specials